Hurt was an American rock band formed in Virginia in 2000. The band has released four major label albums. The band first released the independent albums Hurt in 2000 and The Consumation in 2003. The band received worldwide acclaim with their major label debut album, Vol. 1, released on March 21, 2006. Their singles "Rapture" and "Falls Apart" garnered significant radio airplay. Their second album was the critically acclaimed Vol. II, released on September 25, 2007, and they gained their largest radio hit yet with the single "Ten Ton Brick".

The band went on to release two more albums, Goodbye to the Machine and The Crux. They then disbanded in 2014 shortly before a release of Self-Entitled, a re-release of their first album which was self-titled. No new material has been released since 2012. Cryptic videos were posted to the band's official Facebook page on December 24 and 27, 2019, suggesting the band would be releasing new material.

History

Formation and independent releases (2000–2005)
The band originally composed of J. Loren Wince, age 15, as the main singer, songwriter, and guitarist and Wil Quaintance as a drummer. The two sought other band members for years until picking up Steven Fletcher to play bass guitar. The band was named two years later, upon conception of their first album.

This band's self-titled first studio album was written and performed by Wince and Wil Quaintance on drums, with programming credits given to Brian Winshell on the entire album, except "Confession" by Jonathan Minis. It was released in 2000 and approximately 1,200 copies were created. The band's second independently released album, The Consumation was also written and performed by Wince, with Quaintance on drums, Shawn Sawyer on bass and given credits on the song "Unclean", with Brian Winshell on Engineering for "House of Cards" and "Velvet Rolls Royce". This album was released in 2003 in Wince's home state of Virginia, with approximately 2000 sold, and around 3000 promos and full albums distributed for free.

The band (with the original line-up) was discovered by Tom Lewis, an ex-Universal Records A&R man, somewhere around 2005. The show was at The Continental in New York, where a friend of Lewis, Jay Silverman, passed the band's CD on to him. After the initial contact with Wince, it was another 8 months until they heard from Lewis again. The band met up with Lewis and his company (Metropolitan Hybrid). The band went to record its demo to help find a record label. After undisclosed issues with the current drummer for the band, session drummer Evan Johns was asked if he could be a part of the recording, which Wince agreed to.

In the process of trying to find a major label, the bass player at the time decided it would be best if he quit the band, at which time they began to seek out his replacement, former Streetlight Manifesto bassist Josh Ansley.

When asked about how he became part of the band, Paul Spatola has been quoted in saying that he received a phone call from Josh Ansley, saying he should fly to New York and try out for the band, as they were looking for guitarists. Spatola states, "A month later I didn't hear anything and I said 'I just gotta fly out there.'" His first performance with the band was at a night club called 'The Mint,' at which time, Spatola intended on being with the band for a few days but ended up staying for two weeks. The first day he tried out for the band, and with a little help from Tom Lewis, Wince was convinced to bring Spatola into the band as the guitarist.

The next day, the band played a showcase in New York City, at which time they had spoken with several record companies including Columbia, Interscope, Island, Universal, Virgin and Atlantic, but nothing came of these conversations.

Initially, Capitol Records had purchased the album, Vol. 1, from the band at cost which was approximately 100k. No other apparent changes other than signing the recordings rights to them took place.

Vol. 1 and Vol. II (2006–2008)

The band's first work under a major record label would be two albums entitled Vol. 1 and Vol. II. They were both recorded and produced with Eric Greedy. The initial plan was to have the albums be released as a double album, but Capitol rejected the idea as "too much of an investment at once". Instead, the band used the extra time to re-record and improve upon Vol. II. Vol. 1 was released on March 21, 2006. Three singles were released to radio – "Rapture", "Falls Apart", and "Danse Russe". Vol. II was later released on September 25, 2007, along with two more singles, "Ten Ton Brick" and "Loded". After their having major record label exposure, the band opted to re-release The Consumation as The Re-Consumation on February 19, 2008, in response to fans spending hundreds of dollars to buy their now-rare original independent releases. The re-released contained one new song, and two other altered songs. Shortly afterwards, in April, Ansley announced his departure from the band, to pursue a career in writing and directing.

On May 12, 2009, Hurt received an award for the song "Ten Ton Brick" during SESAC's 13th annual New York Music Awards.

Goodbye to the Machine (2009–2010)
Vol. 1 and Vol. II did not prove to be commercial successes, and as a result, the band was dropped from Capitol Records. Their next album, Goodbye to the Machine, would be an allusion to the band's negativity towards major record labels. The album was released on April 7, 2009, on the much smaller label Amusement Records. Prior to the album's release, the single "Wars" was released to radio on February 3, 2009. The album has peaked at No.100 on the Billboard 200.

The Crux (2010–2014)
The band began working on new material in early 2010. On February 5 the new song "Numbers" made its debut radio play on 94.1 WJJO in Madison, WI. It was released on iTunes on March 9, 2010, with artwork by Spatola. On March 21, the band announced that all tracking had been completed. In August, the band announced they had signed to Carved Records, and aimed to release a new album in early 2012. It was also announced that Spatola had departed the band due to personal issues. On September 27, 2011, on Hurt's Facebook page, the band said that the new album would be a return to both the Vol. albums, in sound and style. The first single, "How We End Up Alone", was released through iTunes on January 3, 2012 and peaked at Number 10 on the Billboard 20. The Crux was released on May 1, 2012, and peaked at Number 75 on Billboard 200. This was the highest Billboard placement in the band's history, and the last time the world would see new material from the Band.

On April 8, 2014 Amusement Management announced their intentions to release a remastered version of the often spoke of the band's self-titled album, stating "It will be remastered and come with a handwritten replication of the lyrics by J. It will most likely not be available digitally". The announcement was made on the band's official Facebook page. The album was released in a limited quantity of only 2000, each individual numbered and signed by J Loren Wince. The album included two bonus tracks; one previously unreleased, "Cellophane", and another, the original version of "Talking to God".

Members

Current members
J. Loren Wince  –  lead vocals, guitar, violin (2000–2014)
Victor Ribas – drums, percussion, piano, backing vocals (2010–2014)

Former members
Wil Quaintance  –  drums  (2000–2004)
Stephen Fletcher  – bass  (2000)
Shawn Sawyer – bass (2000–2004)
Paul Spatola  –  lead guitar, piano, backing vocals  (2004–2011)
Joshua Ansley  –  bass, backing vocals  (2004–2008)
Evan Johns  –  drums  (2004–2008)
Louie Sciancalepore  –  drums (2008–2010)
Rek Mohr  –  bass  (2008–2013)
Michael Roberts – guitar, backing vocals (2009–2012)

Discography

Studio albums
Hurt (2000)
The Consumation (2003)
Vol. 1 (2006)
Vol. II (2007)
Goodbye to the Machine (2009)
The Crux (2012)

References

External links
Hurt's official website

Musical groups established in 2000
American post-grunge musical groups
Capitol Records artists